George DeTitta Jr. (born February 14, 1955) is an American set decorator. He has been nominated for two Academy Awards in the category Best Art Direction.

Selected filmography
DeTitta has been nominated for two Academy Awards for Best Art Direction:
 Radio Days (1987)
 Ragtime (1981)

References 
Primetime Emmy Award/Outstanding Art Direction for a Miniseries/Movie or Special: Angels in America/winner 2003 Winner
               Primetime Emmy Award/Outstanding Production Design for a Narrative Contemporary One Hour Program: Succession 2020 Nominee
               Primetime Emmy Award/Outstanding Production Design for a Narrative Contemporary One Hour Program: Succession 2022 Nominee

External links

1955 births
Living people
American set decorators
Emmy Award winners